Rasteau is an Appellation d'Origine Contrôlée for wine in the southern Rhône wine region of France, covering both fortified and unfortified wines. The sweet fortified wines (Vin Doux Naturel, VDN) can be red, rosé or white, and have long been produced under the Rasteau AOC. In 2010 dry red wines (unfortified) were also added to the appellation, effective from the 2009 vintage.

The Rasteau appellation covers mostly the commune of Rasteau, but also includes some vineyards in Cairanne and Sablet.  of vineyards are used for the fortified wines, with an annual production of around 1,400 hectoliter, or around 190,000 bottles.

History 
The production of fortified wine was introduced in 1934, and in 1944, the Rasteau AOC for VDN wines was created, with effect from the 1943 vintage. Dry red wines from the same area traditionally had to be sold under the Côtes du Rhône Villages designation. From 1996, Rasteau was one of the village names that could be added to Côtes du Rhône Villages. In 2002, the Rasteau winegrower's syndicate requested that Rasteau should become its own appellation. This was finally approved by INAO in 2010, effective from the 2009 vintage.

Grape varieties 

Main grape varieties for the fortified wines are Grenache noir, Grenache gris and Grenache blanc. All grape varieties allowed for red, rosé or white Côtes du Rhône (a total of 18 varieties in addition to the Grenaches) are also allowed as accessory grape varieties for Rasteau AOC, and are limited to a total of 10%. Red Rasteau is typically produced from 100% Grenache noir.

Appellation regulations 

The fortified wines are produced from grape which must reach a maturity of at least 252 grams sugar per liter must, or close to 15 per cent of potential alcohol, which corresponds to very mature grapes. The allowed base yield is 30 hectoliter per hectare. The wine must be fortified by the addition of neutral alcohol (with a minimum strength of 96 per cent by volume), the volume of which must correspond to 5 to 10 per cent of the volume of the grape must. The alcohol level of the finished wine must be at least 15 per cent, and a maximum of 21.5 per cent by volume, and the sugar content at least 45 grams per liter.

There are two special designations which can be used for Rasteau wines:
 Wines marked Hors d'âge must be stored for five years before it is sold.
 Wines marked Rancio must have been subjected to the typical oxidative treatment of that wine style.

References 

 Cotes du Rhone Wines Web Site
Fortified wine
1944 establishments in France